The Paraguaná Peninsula is a peninsula in Venezuela, situated in the north of Falcón State, and comprises the municipalities of Carirubana, Los Taques and Falcón. Bonaire and Curaçao are slightly further away. The Paraguaná Peninsula is connected to the rest of the state by a natural isthmus of Médanos. The Peninsula contains two oil refineries, in the West city of Punto Fijo. The output of these refineries is shipped internationally through the ports of Amuay and Cardón. The Paraguaná Peninsula lies in the Caribbean Sea.

The peninsula lies in the Paraguana xeric scrub ecoregion.

Because it is almost completely surrounded by water, the peninsula is sometimes called an island, and is sometimes considered as part of the Leeward Antilles. It was in fact an island earlier in the Holocene, before a tombolo formed joining Paraguaná to the mainland.

The Solar eclipse of February 26, 1998 was visible from the peninsula. The center line of the eclipse crossed the northern part of the peninsula, parallel to its north-west coastline. The skies were completely clear from the peninsula. Bleachers were set up north of Punto Fijo as a designated eclipse viewing spot.

Economy

Paraguana currently contains two large oil refineries, and the third largest oil refinery complex in the world, the Paraguaná Refinery Complex. Most of the oil that PDVSA acquires is processed in this complex. Many engineers that worked in the refineries have moved to the United States to work at Citgo.

Paraguana is a duty-free zone, therefore many international shops, notably Arabian, have opened.

While most of the economy is centered on the oil industry, tourism is growing. While most of the tourists come from other parts of Venezuela, many tourists come from surrounding countries such as Colombia, Aruba, Bonaire, Curaçao, and even a few tourists from the United States. The beaches serve as a large part of tourist attraction. There is a luxury beachfront hotel called Eurobuilding Villa Caribe. Paraguana also takes advantage of the duty-free shopping for tourism and opened a Paraguana Mall which is used for that. Two shopping malls are in the area. The mall, Las Virtudes, attracts a lot of people, and the mall, Sambil Paraguana, attracts many  tourists, and has a luxury hotel, Lidotel, in it.
Western news sources point to Paraguaná as being an ongoing construction site for launch purposes in connection with Iranian-manufactured and imported ballistic missiles to the Bolivarian Republic under agreement of the late president, Hugo Chavez.

The peninsula is served by Josefa Camejo International Airport in Punto Fijo, among others.

Supermercado La Franco Italiana used to be headquartered in the peninsula, until it was merged with Supermercados De Candido, which maintains branches there.

References

External links

 Images of the Paraguana Peninsula.
 Video of the Paraguana Peninsula.
 NASA Eclipse site for February 26, 1998 total solar eclipse.

Peninsulas of Venezuela
Geography of Falcón
Punto Fijo